Rage is a 2006 German television crime film directed by Züli Aladağ.

Cast 
 Oktay Özdemir - Can
 August Zirner - Simon Laub
 Corinna Harfouch - Christa Laub
  - Felix Laub
  - Michael
 Demir Gökgöl - Can's Father
 Melika Foroutan - Dominique
 Yunus Emre Budak - Hakan

See also 
 Tough Enough (2006)

References

External links 

2006 television films
2006 films
2000s crime films
German television films
2000s German-language films
German-language television shows
Films set in Berlin
Films about bullying
Grimme-Preis for fiction winners
Das Erste original programming